Captain Thunderbolt is a 1953 Australian action film from director Cecil Holmes about the bushranger Captain Thunderbolt. It was one of the few all-Australian films of the 1950s.

Synopsis
Fred Ward is imprisoned for horse stealing. He escapes from Cockatoo Island and under the name of Captain Thunderbolt becomes a bushranger in the New England region, working with his friend and fellow escapee Alan Blake. Blake has a romantic involvement with a "half-caste" (sic) girl Maggie that equally infringes the norms of the day.

Thunderbolt is tracked by the vengeful Trooper Mannix. After gunfights with the bushranger at a dance, then at a rocky outcrop, Mannix discovers that he has killed Alan Blake instead. Mannix passes off Blake's body as Thunderbolt, concealing the bushranger's escape. The legend grows that Thunderbolt did not die.

Cast
Grant Taylor as Captain Thunderbolt
Charles Tingwell as Alan Blake
Rosemary Miller as Joan
Harp McGuire as Trooper Mannix
John Fegan as Sergeant Dalton
Jean Blue as Mrs Ward
John Fernside as Colonel
Loretta Boutmy as Maggie
Ronald Whelan as Hogstone
Charles Tasman as Colonial Secretary
Harvey Adams as parliamentarian
Patricia Hill as Belle
John Brunskill as Judge

Production
The budget was provided entirely by theatrical entrepreneur Sir Benjamin Fuller.

It was a return to leading man roles for Grant Taylor.

The movie was shot in early 1951 on location in New England, New South Wales, and at the Royal National Park in Sydney, with studio work done in Supreme Sound System in North Sydney. The woolshed dance sequence was shot at a Pyrmont woolstore. One of Thunderbolt's robbery victims was played by Kathleen Drummond, daughter of the then-local MP David Drummond.

British censorship requirements meant that the real-life romantic relationship between Thunderbolt and his aboriginal girlfriend Mary, who helped him escape from Cockatoo Island, was not featured in the film when released in Britain. According to Filmink "Holmes was a bit of a lefty in real life, and he fashions the story so poor old Thunderbolt is a victim of the upper classes. Holmes was conservative enough, however, to remove Thunderbolt’s aboriginal wife from the story entirely."

Captain Thunderbolt was allowed to live at the end of the film because the producers hoped to spin it off into a TV series. This did not happen.

Release
The film did not receive a wide release in Australia – it did not play in Melbourne cinemas until late 1955, and Sydney until 1956. However it sold well overseas, including to American television.

The only known copy of the film is in possession of the Australian National Film and Sound Archive. It is the 53-minute TV edition and in 16mm format only. The archive is looking for a copy of the full 69-minute version. The Archive has published the Trailer originating from a 35mm print.

References

External links

Captain Thunderbolt at National Film and Sound Archive
Captain Thunderbolt at Oz Movies
 Specific website for the search for this film.

1953 films
Australian action films
Bushranger films
1950s action films
Australian black-and-white films
1950s English-language films